The 1969 Gator Bowl was a post-season college football bowl game between the Florida Gators and the Tennessee Volunteers, both representing the SEC. Florida defeated Tennessee, 14–13.

Game summary
The expected high-scoring battle featuring Florida's "Super Sophs" passing attack against Tennessee's powerful ground game led by quarterback Bobby Scott never materialized, as both defenses were superb in the Gators' 14–13 win.  Quarterback John Reaves connected with wide receiver Carlos Alvarez for the Gators' only offensive touchdown, and the Gator defense stopped the Volunteers at Florida's one-yard line late in the game to preserve the victory.  The game's MVPs were Florida linebacker Mike Kelley, who had an interception, a fumble recovery, a blocked punt recovered for a touchdown, a sack, and 17 tackles, and fullback Curt Watson of Tennessee.

See also
Florida–Tennessee football rivalry

References

External links
 Video of game via YouTube

Gator Bowl
Gator Bowl
Florida Gators football bowl games
Tennessee Volunteers football bowl games
20th century in Jacksonville, Florida
December 1969 sports events in the United States
Gator Bowl